Tadeusz Antoni Wita (born 4 April 1958, in Zabrze) is a Polish politician. He was elected to the Sejm on 25 September 2005, getting 4,656 votes in 29 Gliwice district as a candidate from the Law and Justice list.
After the death of Zbigniew Religa in March 2009, Wita became a member of the Polish parliament once again.

See also
In 2006 Wita, as part of the Polish representation in the Council of Europe backed up Falun Gong practitioners in urging the Council of Europe to investigate the discovered concentration camps in China, read more about it here: http://clearharmony.net/articles/200604/32635.html
Members of Polish Sejm 2005-2007

External links
Tadeusz Wita - parliamentary page - includes declarations of interest, voting record, and transcripts of speeches.

1958 births
Living people
Members of the Polish Sejm 2005–2007
Law and Justice politicians
Politicians from Zabrze